Korshamn or Korshavn is a fishing village in the southern part of Lyngdal municipality in Agder county, Norway. The village is located on the island of Revøy, located at the mouth of the Grønsfjorden. Korshamn Chapel is located in the village, serving the southern part of the municipality. Traditionally, this was just a fishing village, but it now caters to tourists, primarily through the "Korshamn Rorbuer" rental cottages.

According to Snorre, in the year 1028, King Olaf II (Saint Olaf) made landfall on the island of Sælør, just south of Korshamn with thirteen ships and a thousand men. This event was commemorated by the erection of a sculpture of the king in central Lyngdal, revealed by King Olav V in 1983.

References

External links
Korshamn Rorbuer 
Korshamn.no Weather info, webcam, local pictures

Villages in Agder
Ports and harbours of Norway
Ports and harbours of the North Sea
Lyngdal